The Strymonian or Strymonic Gulf, also known as the Orfano Gulf, is a branch of the Thracian Sea—itself part of the Aegean Sea—lying east of the Chalcidice peninsula and south of the Serres regional unit. It was formerly known as the Gulf of Rendina, in reference to the ancient colony of Eion along the gulf's shores.
The river Struma/Strymon empties into the gulf.

The largest towns on the Strymonic Gulf, with their respective administrative divisions, are:
 Asprovalta, Stavros, Nea Vrasna (Thessaloniki regional unit, Central Macedonia);
 Orfani (Kavala regional unit, East Macedonia and Thrace);
 Olympiada, Stratoni (Chalkidiki regional unit, Central Macedonia);
 Nea Kerdylia, Amfipoli (Serres regional unit, Central Macedonia).

Three mountains form the natural border of the Gulf: Pangaio to the north-east, Kerdylio to the north, and Stratoni to the south.

External links 
 strymonic-gulf.com

Gulfs of Greece
Gulfs of the Aegean Sea
Landforms of Thessaloniki (regional unit)
Landforms of Central Macedonia
Landforms of Kavala (regional unit)
Landforms of Eastern Macedonia and Thrace
Landforms of Chalkidiki
Landforms of Serres (regional unit)
Thracian Sea